Jack Doherty (5 August 1915 – 22 October 1990) was an Australian rules footballer who played with Melbourne in the Victorian Football League (VFL).

Notes

External links 

Australian rules footballers from South Australia
Melbourne Football Club players
South Adelaide Football Club players
1915 births
1990 deaths